The 2007 Leicester City Council election took place on 3 May 2007 to elect members of Leicester City Council in England. This was on the same day as other local elections.

Summary

|}

References

Leicester
Leicester City Council elections
2000s in Leicestershire